Ain't Nature Grand! is a February 1931 Looney Tunes cartoon featuring Bosko. It was directed by Hugh Harman and Rudolf Ising.

Plot
Bosko goes fishing but is distracted by a butterfly, who leads him into a song-and-dance routine with the nature around him. Eventually, two ladybugs drive him away, using a dragonfly as a fighter plane.

References

External links
 
 
 
 

1931 short films
1931 animated films
1931 comedy films
Looney Tunes shorts
Warner Bros. Cartoons animated short films
Films directed by Hugh Harman
American black-and-white films
Bosko films
Films set in North America
Films scored by Frank Marsales
Films directed by Rudolf Ising
1930s Warner Bros. animated short films